KAHL (1310 AM) is a radio station broadcasting an adult standards format. Licensed to San Antonio, Texas, United States, the station serves the San Antonio area.  The station is currently owned by Pearsall Radio Works, Ltd.

Translators

History
The station was assigned the callsign KZVE on April 15, 1991.  On January 15, 1993, the station changed its call sign to KONJ; on July 9, 1993, the callsign changed to KXTN; another callsign change occurred on March 1, 1997 to KPOZ; changing again on January 15, 1999 to KXTN, and on March 1, 2005 to the current KAHL.

References

External links

AHL